Mema and the Great Mountain is a Weird West juvenile fiction novel by Lorin Morgan-Richards about an Indigenous girl named Mema who lives in an oppressed village called Sunken Creek. The primary antagonist in the story, Baron Von Nickle, commands his army to forcibly remove the villagers, leading Mema to flee but without the aid of her grandfather and wolf Bright Eye. Escaping the attack with only her dolls, Xetacu and Tchesue, Mema begins her journey bringing to focus her extraordinary ability to communicate with the spirit world. Along her path she confronts ghoulish characters, reacquaints with her wolf, and is carefully guided by unusual animals that try to help her overcome her fears and battle the Baron. The book includes a foreword by Oglala Lakota educator Corine Fairbanks who writes on the worldwide genocide of Indigenous people and the effects of industrialization, a common theme in Richards work.

Mema and the Great Mountain is the first book in the Great Mountain series that introduces the characters and features of the land including The Goodbye Family.

Writing style and themes

Symbolism 
Richards stories often express an underlying environmental message with a proposed solution. In this work, a mining tycoon is clearing the land of the villagers and plundering its resources. Me'ma uses traditional knowledge to battle the antagonist.

Chapter list 
 Foreword
 The Darkening Sky
 Mema Finds Comfort in her Dolls
 The Lanky Mink
 Meeting the Drifter
 How Mema Learns of the Serpent
 A Messy Encounter
 The Arched Forest
 The Fort's Unusual Inhabitants
 The Crow's Big Break
 Reacquainting with an Old Friend
 Nicklesworth
 Mema Feels Betrayed
 The Baron Does an Evil Thing
 Fighting the Serpent
 The Crow's Promise
 A New Beginning

Characters 
 Mema: child who lives with her grandfather and wolf Bright Eye. She comes from Sunken Creek, a barren area of the Great Mountain. Her journey begins with an attack on her village by Baron Von Nickle's encroaching army. She escapes to freedom and ultimately uses the traditional knowledge her grandfather taught her to survive.    
 Grandfather: the grandfather teaches Mema how to hone her special gift and use it for good.   
 Hollis Sorrow: A farmer who was hung by the neck. Mema finds Hollis alert and floating in a casket down the river. He participated non-combatively in the war of the Tried and Boorish. His old friends are John Gravely and Wilks Barrow whom he shared a prison cell but it is in Mema and Madeline Sage he finds renewed life.  
The character for Hollis Sorrow is partly based on an experience the author had after visiting a psychic. He relates: Many years ago I visited a medium in Cassadaga, Florida who said in a past life I was a horse thief who was hung for his crime. I don’t know how true this is, but oddly, I have had neck issues ever since I was a child. My character Hollis Sorrow from Mema and the Great Mountain carries a noose around his neck and has a terrible time keeping his head upright. Hollis was developed from my personality.  
 Madeline Sage: Once a circus performer whom is sawed in half after a magic act accident. She crashes into Mema during a wild chase on the road. She befriends Hollis Sorrow and the child but her trust is questioned which she proves later.     
 John Gravely: A poet who is forced to fight in the war of the Tried and Boorish and imprisoned with Hollis Sorrow and Wilks Barrow.   
 Wilks Barrow: A lieutenant who is imprisoned with Hollis Sorrow and John Gravely. He was passionate about art over war.   
 Baron Von Nickle: railroad tycoon who forcibly took over the Indigenous land east of the Great Mountain. He was a proponent of war during the Innocents and Troublers, and who serves as the primary antagonist in Mema's journey.    
 Frank Thorne: The brutal outlaw that led the army west seizing land and capturing villagers to work in the Baron's mines.

See also
 The Goodbye Family

References 

2012 American novels
2012 children's books
2012 fantasy novels
American novel series
Environmental fiction books
Fantasy Westerns
Native Americans in popular culture
Trains in fiction
Western (genre) novels